The Lehua Night Market is a night market in Yonghe District, New Taipei, Taiwan.

History
In 2012, a group filed a complaint to the night market citing the community's safety was compromised by the presence of the night market vendors. In 2015, the night market faced risk of being closed.

Features
The night market, which was set up in the 1970s, offers a rich mix of snack stalls, shopping and entertainment facilities including the KTV chain Party World. Taiwanese food such as rice cakes, tempura, oyster omelet, shrimp and meat stew and shaved ice can be found here. It is often packed during the weekends and most of the stores stayed open until midnight.

Transportation
The night market is accessible within walking distance South of Dingxi Station of Taipei Metro.

See also
 List of night markets in Taiwan

References

External links

 

Night markets in New Taipei
Banqiao District